Centre Square Mall is an enclosed shopping mall in Yellowknife, Northwest Territories, Canada. The mall is noteworthy for being the largest shopping centre in the territory and the tallest building in Northern Canada. The first phase of the mall was opened in August 1990; the expansion of the mall beneath the Yellowknife Inn was opened in January 1995.

Although this mall is one of the northernmost malls in North America, Bentley Mall in Fairbanks, Alaska is 2 degrees further north.

Overview 
The mall contains shops, Tim Hortons, government offices, the Workers' Safety and Compensation Commission, the Yellowknife Inn, Northern Heights condominium, Yellowknife Visitor Centre, and the Yellowknife Public Library. The mall is the host of activities for Family Literacy Day as mentioned in L'Aquilon, the local francophone newspaper.

See also 
 List of tallest buildings in Yellowknife
 Azimut Hotel Murmansk - tallest building in the world north of the Arctic Circle and the second tallest building in the world north of 60°N.

References

External links 
 Centre Square Mall website

Shopping malls in Canada
Buildings and structures in Yellowknife
Commercial buildings completed in 1996